Santosh Kumar Sen (1910–1979) was an Indian surgeon and the president of the Association of Surgeons of India. He was the first Indian surgeon to be elected to the Fellowship of the Royal College of Surgeons of England.

Sen was born on October 21, 1910 in Delhi. After early education in Delhi, he graduated in medicine from Lahore and went to Vienna where he practiced surgery under many noted surgeons including Lorenz Böhler. He earned a fellowship of the Royal College of Surgeons of Edinburgh and on his return to India in 1938, he joined Irwin Hospital (present-day Lok Nayak Jai Prakash Narayan Hospital), New Delhi as its first honorary consultant surgeon. During his years at Irwin Hospital, he contributed to the establishment of Maulana Azad Medical College where he served as the first honorary faculty surgeon and the head of post graduate studies. He was one of the founder members of Delhi Surgical Society, served as the president of Delhi Medical Association, one of the oldest medical associations in the world, and Thoracic Surgeons Association, and sat in the court of the University of Delhi. He also served as the president of the Association of Surgeons of India in 1959. The Government of India awarded him Padma Bhushan, the third highest Indian civilian award, in 1962.

Sen was married to Sita, a medical practitioner, and the couple had a son and two daughters. He died in 1979, survived by his children; his wife had predeceased him.

See also

 Thayil John Cherian
 Shantilal Jamnadas Mehta

References

Recipients of the Padma Bhushan in medicine
20th-century Indian medical doctors
1910 births
1979 deaths
Indian medical administrators
Academic staff of Delhi University
Fellows of the Royal College of Surgeons of Edinburgh
Fellows of the Royal College of Surgeons
Medical doctors from Delhi
Indian thoracic surgeons
Indian cardiac surgeons
Indian medical academics
20th-century surgeons